Abeita is a surname. Notable people with the surname include:

 Emerson Abeita (1957 – 2017) Navajo painter from Crownpoint, New Mexico
 Jim Abeita (b. 1947), Navajo oil painter from Crownpoint, New Mexico
 Louise Abeita (1926–2014), American writer, poet, and educator
 Pablo Abeita (1871–1940), American politician

See also 
 People with last name Abeyta